The Johan Setia LRT station is designated to be an elevated light rapid transit (LRT) station in Johan Setia, Klang, Selangor, Malaysia, forming part of the Shah Alam Line.

The station is marked as Station No. 26 which is also the terminus for the RM9 billion line project. The Shah Alam line's maintenance depot is located next to the Johan Setia LRT station. The Johan Setia LRT station is expected to be operational in February 2024.

Surrounding developments
Major landmarks and developments in the vicinity of this Station:
 Bandar Parklands (Bandar Bukit Tinggi 3)
 Bandar Bestari (Canary Garden)
 Kota Bayuemas
 SAZEAN Business Park

References

External links
 Official LRT 3 project website
 LRT 3 project video
 Prasarana Malaysia Berhad, LRT 3 operator
 Johan Setia LRT Station - mrt.com.my

Shah Alam Line